|}

The Scottish Grand National is a Grade 3 National Hunt steeplechase in Great Britain which is open to horses aged five years or older. It is run at Ayr, Scotland, over a distance of about 4 miles (3 miles 7 furlongs and 176 yards,  or 6,397 metres) and during its running there are 27 fences to be jumped. It is a handicap race, and takes place each year in April.
It is Scotland's equivalent of the Grand National, and is held during Ayr's two-day Scottish Grand National Festival meeting.

History
The race, then known as the "West of Scotland Grand National", was first run at a course near Houston, Renfrewshire in 1858. It consisted of 32 jumps, mainly stone walls.

In 1867, after objections by the leader of the Free Kirk in Houston, the race moved to Bogside Racecourse, near Irvine. The inaugural winner at Bogside, The Elk, was owned by the Duke of Hamilton. During the early part of its history the race's distance was about three miles. It was later extended to 3⅞ miles, and became known by its present title in 1880, when it was won by Peacock.

Bogside Racecourse closed in 1965, and the Scottish Grand National was transferred to Ayr the following year. At this point the race was increased to its present length. Several winners of the Scottish Grand National have also won its English counterpart at Aintree. The first to complete the double was Music Hall, the winner of the 1922 Grand National. The feat has been achieved more recently by Little Polveir and Earth Summit, but the only horse to win both races in the same year was Red Rum in 1974.

In 2021, the race was moved to a Sunday due to the funeral of Prince Philip, the Duke of Edinburgh, taking place on Saturday

Prize money
The winning horse in 1867 won £100, increasing to £440 by 1906, £1030 in 1950, £5,436 in 1963 and £122,433 in 2019.

Television coverage
The first television coverage of the Scottish National was in 1953 on the BBC.  It was also shown the following year, but then wasn't screened again until 1969 on ITV and has been shown live ever since.  Coverage moved to Channel 4 in 1986 and back to ITV in 2017.

Records
Most successful horse (3 wins):
 Couvrefeu II – 1911, 1912, 1913
 Southern Hero – 1934, 1936, 1939
 Queen's Taste – 1953, 1954, 1956

Leading jockey
All-time (4 wins)
Charlie Cunningham – Bellman (1881), Wild Meadow (1885), Orcadian (1887), Deloraine (1889)
At Ayr (3 wins)
 Mark Dwyer – Androma (1984, 1985), Moorcroft Boy (1996)

Leading trainer
All-time (5 wins)
Neville Crump – Wot No Sun (1949), Merryman II (1959), Arcturus (1968), Salkeld (1980), Canton (1983)
Ken Oliver – Pappageno's Cottage (1963), The Spaniard (1970), Young Ash Leaf (1971), Fighting Fit (1979), Cockle Strand (1982)
At Ayr (4 wins)
Ken Oliver – The Spaniard (1970), Young Ash Leaf (1971), Fighting Fit (1979), Cockle Strand (1982)

Winners at Ayr
 Weights given in stones and pounds

Winners at Bogside

Earlier winners

 1867 – The Elk
 1868 – Greenland
 1869 – Huntsman
 1870 – Snowstorm
 1871 – Keystone
 1872 – Cinna
 1873 – Hybla
 1874 – Ouragon II
 1875 – Solicitor
 1876 – Earl Marshal
 1877 – Solicitor
 1878 – no race
 1879 – Militant
 1880 – Peacock
 1881 – Bellman
 1882 – Gunboat
 1883 – Kerclaw
 1884 – The Peer
 1885 – Wild Meadow
 1886 – Crossbow
 1887 – Orcadian
 1888 – Ireland
 1889 – Deloraine
 1890 – no race
 1891 – see note below
 1892 – Lizzie
 1893 – Lady Ellen II
 1894 – Leybourne
 1895 – Nepcote
 1896 – Cadlaw Cairn
 1897 – Modest Friar
 1898 – Trade Mark
 1899 – Tyrolean
 1900 – Dorothy Vane
 1901 – Big Busbie
 1902 – Canter Home
 1903 – Chit Chat
 1904 – Innismacsaint
 1905 – Theodocian
 1906 – Creolin
 1907 – Barney III
 1908 – Atrato
 1909 – Mount Prospect's Fortune
 1910 – The Duffrey
 1911 – Couvrefeu II
 1912 – Couvrefeu II
 1913 – Couvrefeu II
 1914 – Scrabee
 1915 – Templedowney
 1916 – no race
 1917 – no race
 1918 – no race
 1919 – The Turk
 1920 – Music Hall
 1921 – no race
 1922 – Sergeant Murphy
 1923 – Harrismith
 1924 – Royal Chancellor
 1925 – Gerald L.
 1926 – Estuna
 1927 – Estuna
 1928 – Ardeen
 1929 – Donzelon
 1930 – Drintyre
 1931 – Annandale
 1932 – Clydesdale
 1933 – Libourg
 1934 – Southern Hero
 1935 – Kellsboro' Jack
 1936 – Southern Hero
 1937 – Right'un
 1938 – Young Mischief
 1939 – Southern Hero
 1940–46 – no race

See also
 Horse racing in Scotland
 List of British National Hunt races

Sources

References

 Racing Post:

External links
pedigreequery.com – Scottish Grand National Handicap Chase – Ayr.
 racenewsonline.co.uk – Racenews Archive (12 April 2002).
 tbheritage.com – Scottish Grand National.
 Race Recordings 

National Hunt races in Great Britain
Ayr Racecourse
National Hunt chases
Horse racing in Scotland
Recurring sporting events established in 1867
1867 establishments in Scotland
Sports competitions in Scotland